Jackson Building may refer to:

Jackson Building (Clarkesville, Georgia), listed on the NRHP in Habersham County, Georgia
Jackson Building (Gainesville, Georgia), listed on the NRHP in Hall County, Georgia
 Jackson Building (Asheville, North Carolina)
Jackson Tower, Portland, Oregon
Miller-Jackson Building, Oklahoma City, Oklahoma, listed on the NRHP in Oklahoma County, Oklahoma
Mary W. Jackson Building, Washington, D.C., NASA Headquarters

See also

 Jackson School (disambiguation), including school buildings
 Jackson (disambiguation)